Frances Grey may refer to:
Frances Grey (actress) (born 1970), Scottish television actress
Frances Grey, Duchess of Suffolk (1517–1559), granddaughter of Henry VII of England and mother of Lady Jane Grey

See also 
Frances M. Gray (1910–2001), first president of Damavand College (1968-1975)
Frances Gray Patton (1906–2000), writer
Francis Gray (disambiguation)